Soroka University Medical Center (HaMerkaz HaRefu'i Soroka), part of the Clalit Health Services Group, is the general hospital of Beersheba, Israel, it serves as the central hospital of the region and provides medical services to approximately one million residents of the South, from Kiryat Gat and Ashkelon to Eilat.

Soroka provides medical care to members of all populations in the region, including Negev Bedouins and Palestinians from the West Bank and Gaza Strip. It is a teaching hospital affiliated with the faculty of Health Sciences at Ben-Gurion University of the Negev whose campus is adjacent to the hospital.

History
Following the 1948 Arab–Israeli War, the Medical Corps established a temporary military hospital in one of the Ottoman government buildings in Beersheva. A year later, the hospital was transferred to a British government compound, where it was run by the Hadassah Medical Association and named after Dr. Chaim Yassky.

In 1949, Clalit Health Fund of the Hebrew Workers in Eretz Israel opened a clinic in the city to serve citizens who were members of the Histadrut. This clinic required hospital services for continued treatment. The nearest hospital was the Kaplan Medical Center in Rehovot, but it was relatively far away, and patients had to travel and endure the poor road conditions of the time until they received treatment.

In 1950, Beersheva was declared a civic authority, with the result that thousands of immigrants went to settle there. With the increase in the number of residents, the existing small hospital was unable to answer the needs of the population.

Hadassah expressed willingness to expand its facilities, but due to budgetary constraints caused by the construction of Hadassah Hospital in Jerusalem they were not able to expand the hospital within a reasonable amount of time.

David Ben-Gurion, with his national approach, thought that the government should establish a hospital in the Negev and that it should not be established by Hadassah or the Histadrut, but the Health Ministry had no funds to invest in this effort.

David Tuviyahu, who served as mayor of the city of Beersheva, joined the effort to establish a larger, more spacious and modern hospital. For this purpose, he met with various individuals, among them Moshe Soroka, chairman of the Clalit Health Services. Soroka expressed his willingness in principle for the Histadrut Health Fund to establish a hospital, but Minister of Health Yosef Serlin, who aspired to reduce the activity of the fund and transfer it to the state, objected to this idea.

In August 1955, Dov Begun, representative of the Histadrut in the United States, convinced the president of the International Ladies' Garment Workers' Union, David Dubinsky (1892–1982) to donate US$1 million (a quarter million every year for four years) toward establishing a hospital in the Negev that would commemorate the organization's name. According to press reports at the time, Dubinsky had indicated that the ILGWU might make a further $500,000 available to the hospital after the $1,000,000 contribution was completed, as the estimated construction cost was $1,500,000.

At the end of that year, a new government was formed and Yisrael Barzilai was appointed minister of health. He supported the establishment of the hospital and convinced Ben-Gurion to allow Clalit to set up a new hospital in Beersheva, while the Ministry of Health would establish one in Ashkelon (now Barzilai Medical Center). One of the things that convinced Ben-Gurion was his fear that the planned Sinai War would result in a shortage of hospital beds for wounded soldiers.

On July 23, 1956, ground was broken on the new hospital. The hospital building was designed by architects Arieh Sharon and Benjamin Idelson.

In October 1959, the opening ceremony of the Central Hospital of the Negev was held. At first, the hospital contained several vital departments: the General Surgery Department (in the framework of which were the Otolaryngology Department, the Ophthalmology Department, and the Urology Department), two internal medicine departments, the Orthopedic Department, the Cardiology Institute, and the Radiology Institute. Later, additional departments were opened.

After the death of Moshe Soroka, the director of Clalit Health Organization in the 1950s, who played a significant role in establishing the hospital, it was decided to name the hospital in his memory.

  
In 2018, Shlomi Codish was named director-general of the hospital replacing Ehud Davidson, who held the post for five years.

The сampus

The hospital covers an area of 286 dunams, with a constructed area of more than 200,000 square meters, and includes 30 buildings.

Among the buildings on campus are the following:

 The Internal Medicine Building, located at the center of the campus, houses most of the departments from the field of internal medicine: the internal medicine departments, the Neurology Department, the Nephrology Department and the Dialysis Unit.
 The Camelia Botnar Surgical Building was inaugurated in 2003. It contains the hospital's state-of-the-art operating rooms, six patient wards, the Emergency Room, the Intensive Care Unit, and other units.
 The Saban Pediatric Medical Center, inaugurated in 2008, includes the Pediatric Emergency Room, the Pediatric Intensive Care Unit, the three pediatric inpatient wards, the Pediatric Surgery Department, the Hemato-Oncology Department, and the Department of Eating Disorders.
 The Saban Birth and Maternity Center was inaugurated in 2011 and includes 25 spacious and protected individual delivery rooms, the gynecology and obstetrics emergency rooms, advanced operating rooms, and five maternity wards.
 The Legacy Heritage Oncology Center and Dr. Larry Norton Institute, inaugurated in 2018, provides all the services in the field of cancer treatment and research under one roof.
 Additional buildings in the hospital compound, among them the rehabilitation medicine building, are being constructed these days. At present, there is a rehabilitation department with 20 beds. The hospital is currently working on the project of constructing a rehabilitation building that will allow the expansion of both hospitalization and ambulatory services.

Soroka in numbers

Soroka Medical Center has over 40 inpatient departments and 1,173 hospital beds. In addition to the hospital departments, there are dozens of other units that provide services to hospitalized and ambulatory patients, in the Emergency Medicine Department, institutes, and outpatient clinics.

Soroka's Department of Emergency Medicine, with the largest volume of activity in Israel (more than 250,000 visits annually), is the leading such department in the country according to a health care survey on service and quality conducted by the Ministry of Health.

Soroka's delivery room has the most births of any in the country – more than 17,400 babies are born every year.

In 2022, 32,000 surgeries were performed at the hospital and 100,000 hospitalizations took place. There were over 600,000 visits to the outpatient clinics.

Soroka has some 5,300 employees, including more than 900 doctors, 2,000 nurses, 800 health workers and 500 administrative employees.

Patients at Soroka
Soroka Medical Center provides medical services to more than one million residents of the Negev who reside in a vast geographical area that comprises 60% of the country. The population of the Negev is relatively young, culturally diverse, largely of low to middle-level socioeconomic status, and has unique health needs.

Unique populations cared for at Soroka include Bedouins, who make up nearly a third of the population and large groups of immigrants from Ethiopia and the former Soviet Union.

Standards of safety and quality

 The Joint Commission International (JCI)  Quality and Safety Certificate - Soroka Medical Center was one of three Clalit hospitals which were the first in Israel to receive the certificate of accreditation of the JCI in 2008.
 Standards for Environmental Management Systems (ISO 14001) - Soroka is a green hospital. In 2014 the medical center was awarded the Environmental Quality Award.
 Health Information Security Standard (ISO 27799).
 Systems and structures maintenance Standard (ISO 9001).
 Quality Management Standard (ISO 9000) was granted to the Neonatal Intensive Care unit and the logistics department.

A University Medical Center
Soroka Medical Center is a university medical center that maintains close ties with Ben-Gurion University of the Negev (BGU). In this framework, the hospital staff partners in training the future generation of clinicians and managers in the health system in various fields: medicine, nursing, physiotherapy, emergency medicine, pharmacy, medical laboratory, public health, and health systems management. Approximately 1,000 students study at the hospital annually. The campus of BGU's Faculty of Health Sciences is located in the hospital compound.

Research
Many clinical trials approved by the Helsinki Committee are conducted at Soroka. As of 2023, the committee is chaired by Prof. Eitan Lunenfeld.

A center for clinical research operates at Soroka, leading and promoting research with hospital staff and colleagues outside of the hospital in Israel and abroad, sometimes in cooperation with BGU.

Every year, approximately 300 new studies are approved at the hospital, and some 600 articles on research of clinical and managerial significance have been published in the scientific literature.

Soroka in times of emergency
Soroka Medical Center has accumulated extensive experience over the years in managing various emergency situations.

 Mass-casualty incidents – road accidents, earthquakes, terrorist incidents, and so on. 
 Situations of regional or comprehensive fighting – during times of combat in the South (such as Operation Protective Edge), Soroka Medical Center, is also subject to rocket fire and remains fully operational while ensuring protection for patients and professional teams and providing continuous service to the hospitalized and injured.

The emergency events are managed by a dedicated staff at the hospital in cooperation with many bodies in accordance with the nature of the event: the IDF, the Israel Police, Magen David Adom, the Home Front Command, other hospitals, and more.

Activities for the community
Soroka Medical Center is located in the community it serves and works to develop and promote programs aimed at improving quality of life and community health. The staff members of Soroka take part in a wide variety of social activities within and outside of the hospital. The activities are adapted to different target audiences. Among the activities are:

 Soroka at the Bar – a series of lectures by hospital experts on various subjects for the general public
 Ushpizin – lectures by medical staff from various fields of medicine for high school students and tours of various departments
 Accompanying and assisting Holocaust survivors – Soroka staff members visit Holocaust survivors who are hospitalized and also conduct weekly visits to the homes of survivors. Soroka employees volunteer at Amcha clubs in various fields of activity.

Soroka directors throughout the generations

See also
Health care in Israel
List of hospitals in Israel

References

External links 

Official website (in English)
 
American website
Official Facebook page
information booklet from the official website

Hospital buildings completed in 1959
Hospitals in Israel
Buildings and structures in Beersheba
Medical education in Israel
Teaching hospitals